The Landau Gold Medal is the highest award in theoretical physics awarded by the Russian Academy of Sciences and its predecessor the Soviet Academy of Sciences. It was established in 1971 and is named after Soviet physicist and Nobel Laureate Lev Landau. When awarded by the Soviet Academy of Sciences the award was the "Landau Prize"; the name was changed to the "Landau Gold Medal" in 1992.

Prize laureates
1971 - Vladimir Gribov
1974 - Evgeny Lifshitz, Vladimir Belinski, and Isaak Khalatnikov
1977 - Arkady Migdal
1980 - Aleksandr Gurevich and Lev Pitaevskii
1983 - Alexander Patashinski and Valery Pokrovsky
1986 - Boris Shklovskii and Alexei L. Efros
1989 - Alexei Abrikosov, Lev Gor'kov, and Igor Dzyaloshinskii
1992 - Grigoriy Volovik and Vladimir P. Mineev
1998 - Spartak Belyaev
2002 - Lev Okun
2008 - Lev Pitaevskii
2013 - Semyon Gershtein
2018 - Valery Pokrovsky

See also

 List of physics awards
 Prizes named after people

References

Awards established in 1971
Orders, decorations, and medals of Russia
Orders, decorations, and medals of the Soviet Union
Physics awards
Awards of the Russian Academy of Sciences
USSR Academy of Sciences
1971 establishments in the Soviet Union